Laccophilus is a genus of water beetle found in nearly every temperate or tropical region in the world including but not limited to Europe, the Near East, the Nearctic, North Africa and the Oriental region. It contains the following species:

 Laccophilus addendus Sharp, 1882
 Laccophilus adjutor Guignot, 1950
 Laccophilus adspersus Boheman, 1848
 Laccophilus aemulus Guignot, 1955
 Laccophilus aequatorius Peschet, 1923
 Laccophilus agilis Sharp, 1887
 Laccophilus alluaudi Régimbart, 1900
 Laccophilus amicus Guignot, 1955
 Laccophilus amoenus Régimbart, 1889
 Laccophilus angustus Régimbart, 1889
 Laccophilus anticatus Sharp, 1890
 Laccophilus aurofasciatus Vazirani, 1972
 Laccophilus auropictus Régimbart, 1899
 Laccophilus bacchusi Brancucci, 1983
 Laccophilus badeni Sharp, 1882
 Laccophilus balzani Régimbart, 1889
 Laccophilus bapak Balke, Larson & Hendrich, 1997
 Laccophilus baturitiensis Hendrich & Balke, 1995
 Laccophilus benoiti Guignot, 1953
 Laccophilus bergeri Guignot, 1953
 Laccophilus beroni Rocchi, 1986
 Laccophilus biai Bilardo & Rocchi, 1990
 Laccophilus bicolor Laporte, 1835
 Laccophilus bifasciatus Chevrolat, 1863
 Laccophilus biguttatus Kirby, 1837
 Laccophilus bilardoi Pederzani & Rocchi, 1982
 Laccophilus bilix Guignot, 1952
 Laccophilus bizonatus Régimbart, 1895
 Laccophilus boukali Hájek & Stastný, 2005
 Laccophilus brasiliensis Régimbart, 1889
 Laccophilus brownei Guignot, 1947
 Laccophilus burgeoni Gschwendtner, 1930
 Laccophilus caiaricus Guignot, 1956
 Laccophilus calvus Guignot, 1955
 Laccophilus canthydroides Omer-Cooper, 1957
 Laccophilus carbonelli Guignot, 1957
 Laccophilus castaneus Guignot, 1956
 Laccophilus cayennensis Aubé, 1838
 Laccophilus ceylonicus Zimmermann, 1919
 Laccophilus chelinus Guignot, 1955
 Laccophilus chilensis Sharp, 1882
 Laccophilus chinensis Boheman, 1858
 Laccophilus chini Balke, Mazzoldi & Hendrich, 1998
 Laccophilus cingulatus Sharp, 1882
 Laccophilus clarki Sharp, 1882
 Laccophilus comes Guignot, 1955
 Laccophilus comoensis Pederzani & Reintjes, 2002
 Laccophilus complicatus Sharp, 1882
 Laccophilus concettae Pederzani, 1983
 Laccophilus concisus Guignot, 1953
 Laccophilus congener Omer-Cooper, 1957
 Laccophilus conjunctus Guignot, 1950
 Laccophilus continentalis Gschwendtner, 1935
 Laccophilus contiro Guignot, 1952
 Laccophilus corystes Zhang, 1989
 Laccophilus curvifasciatus Guignot, 1952
 Laccophilus cyclopis Sharp, 1882
 Laccophilus deceptor Guignot, 1953
 Laccophilus decoratus Boheman, 1858
 Laccophilus demoflysi Normand, 1938
 Laccophilus desintegratus Régimbart, 1895
 Laccophilus difficilis Sharp, 1873
 Laccophilus dikinohaseus Kamite, Hikida & Satô, 2005
 Laccophilus dreheri Guignot, 1952
 Laccophilus duplex Sharp, 1882
 Laccophilus ekari Balke, Larson & Hendrich, 1997
 Laccophilus elegans Sharp, 1882
 Laccophilus ellipticus Régimbart, 1889
 Laccophilus epibletus Guignot, 1955
 Laccophilus epinephes Guignot, 1955
 Laccophilus epipleuricus Zimmermann, 1921
 Laccophilus espanyoli Hernando, 1990
 Laccophilus evanescens Régimbart, 1895
 Laccophilus fasciatus Aubé, 1838
 Laccophilus filicornis Sharp, 1887
 Laccophilus flaveolus Régimbart, 1906
 Laccophilus flaviventris Régimbart, 1904
 Laccophilus flavopictus Régimbart, 1889
 Laccophilus flavoscriptus Régimbart, 1895
 Laccophilus flexuosus Aubé, 1838
 Laccophilus flores Hendrich & Balke, 1998
 Laccophilus fractus Sharp, 1882
 Laccophilus fragilis Sharp, 1887
 Laccophilus freudei Guignot, 1957
 Laccophilus fumatus Sharp, 1882
 Laccophilus fuscipennis Sharp, 1882
 Laccophilus garambanus Guignot, 1958
 Laccophilus gentilis LeConte, 1863
 Laccophilus girardi Brancucci, 1983
 Laccophilus gounellei Régimbart, 1903
 Laccophilus grammicus Sharp, 1882
 Laccophilus grammopterus Zimmermann, 1925
 Laccophilus guignoti Legros, 1954
 Laccophilus guttalis Régimbart, 1893
 Laccophilus heidiae Brancucci, 1983
 Laccophilus horni Branden, 1885
 Laccophilus huastecus Zimmerman, 1970
 Laccophilus hyalinus (De Geer, 1774)
 Laccophilus immitis Guignot, 1952
 Laccophilus immundus Sharp, 1882
 Laccophilus inagua Young, 1963
 Laccophilus incrassatus Gschwendtner, 1933
 Laccophilus indicus Gschwendtner, 1936
 Laccophilus inefficiens (Walker, 1859)
 Laccophilus inornatus Zimmermann, 1926
 Laccophilus intermedius Régimbart, 1889
 Laccophilus irroratus Aubé, 1838
 Laccophilus javanicus Régimbart, 1899
 Laccophilus kaensis Brancucci, 1983
 Laccophilus kaszabi Brancucci, 1983
 Laccophilus kempi Gschwendtner, 1936
 Laccophilus kobensis Sharp, 1873
 Laccophilus laeticulus Régimbart, 1895
 Laccophilus laetus Guignot, 1955
 Laccophilus lateralis Sharp, 1882
 Laccophilus latifrons Sharp, 1882
 Laccophilus latipennis Brancucci, 1983
 Laccophilus latipes Sharp, 1882
 Laccophilus leechi Zimmerman, 1970
 Laccophilus leonensis Régimbart, 1895
 Laccophilus lewisioides Brancucci, 1983
 Laccophilus lewisius Sharp, 1873
 Laccophilus lineatus Aubé, 1838
 Laccophilus luctuosus Sharp, 1882
 Laccophilus luteosignatus Gschwendtner, 1943
 Laccophilus macronychus Guignot, 1957
 Laccophilus maculosus Say, 1823
 Laccophilus mahakamensis Balke, Mazzoldi & Hendrich, 1998
 Laccophilus maindroni Régimbart, 1897
 Laccophilus mateui Omer-Cooper, 1970
 Laccophilus mathani Guignot, 1955
 Laccophilus medialis Sharp, 1882
 Laccophilus mediocris Guignot, 1952
 Laccophilus meii Rocchi, 2000
 Laccophilus melas Guignot, 1958
 Laccophilus menieri Brancucci, 1983
 Laccophilus mexicanus Aubé, 1838
 Laccophilus minutus (Linnaeus, 1758)
 Laccophilus mirabilis Guignot, 1956
 Laccophilus mistecus Sharp, 1882
 Laccophilus modestus Régimbart, 1895
 Laccophilus morondavensis Guignot, 1957
 Laccophilus mutatus Omer-Cooper, 1970
 Laccophilus nakajimai Kamite, Hikida & Satô, 2005
 Laccophilus nastus Spangler, 1966
 Laccophilus necopinus Guignot, 1942
 Laccophilus newtoni Brancucci, 1983
 Laccophilus nigricans Sharp, 1882
 Laccophilus nigrocinctus Guignot, 1955
 Laccophilus nodieri Régimbart, 1895
 Laccophilus normifer Guignot, 1958
 Laccophilus notatus Boheman, 1858
 Laccophilus nubilus Régimbart, 1889
 Laccophilus oberthueri Régimbart, 1889
 Laccophilus obesus Sharp, 1882
 Laccophilus obliquatus Régimbart, 1889
 Laccophilus octolineatus Zimmermann, 1921
 Laccophilus olsoufieffi Guignot, 1937
 Laccophilus ornatus Aubé, 1838
 Laccophilus oscillator Sharp, 1882
 Laccophilus ovatus Sharp, 1882
 Laccophilus pallescens Régimbart, 1903
 Laccophilus pampinatus Guignot, 1941
 Laccophilus papuanus Balke, Larson & Hendrich, 1997
 Laccophilus paraguensis Régimbart, 1903
 Laccophilus paranus Guignot, 1957
 Laccophilus parvulus Aubé, 1838
 Laccophilus pellucidus Sharp, 1882
 Laccophilus penes Guignot, 1954
 Laccophilus peregrinus Zimmerman, 1970
 Laccophilus perparvulus Régimbart, 1895
 Laccophilus perplexus Omer-Cooper, 1970
 Laccophilus persimilis Régimbart, 1895
 Laccophilus pictipennis Sharp, 1882
 Laccophilus pictus Laporte, 1835
 Laccophilus plagiatus Régimbart, 1889
 Laccophilus planodes Guignot, 1955
 Laccophilus ploterus Spangler, 1966
 Laccophilus poecilus Klug, 1834
 Laccophilus posticus Aubé, 1838
 Laccophilus productus Régimbart, 1906
 Laccophilus propinquus Omer-Cooper, 1958
 Laccophilus proximus Say, 1823
 Laccophilus pseudanticatus Toledo, Hendrich & Stastný, 2002
 Laccophilus pseudomexicanus Zimmerman, 1970
 Laccophilus pseustes Guignot, 1955
 Laccophilus pulcher Bilardo & Rocchi, 2004
 Laccophilus pulicarius Sharp, 1882
 Laccophilus punctatissimus Brancucci, 1983
 Laccophilus pusulatus Zhang, 1989
 Laccophilus pyrraces Guignot, 1955
 Laccophilus quadrilineatus Horn, 1871
 Laccophilus quadrimaculatus Sharp, 1882
 Laccophilus quadrisignatus Laporte, 1835
 Laccophilus quadrivittatus Aubé, 1838
 Laccophilus quindecimvittatus Régimbart, 1895
 Laccophilus raitti Zimmerman, 1970
 Laccophilus ramuensis Balke, Larson & Hendrich, 1997
 Laccophilus religatus Sharp, 1882
 Laccophilus remator Sharp, 1882
 Laccophilus remex Guignot, 1952
 Laccophilus ritsemae Régimbart, 1880
 Laccophilus rivulosus Klug, 1833
 Laccophilus rotundatus Sharp, 1882
 Laccophilus ruficollis Zimmermann, 1919
 Laccophilus saegeri Guignot, 1958
 Laccophilus salobrinus Guignot, 1958
 Laccophilus salvini Sharp, 1882
 Laccophilus samuelsoni Brancucci, 1983
 Laccophilus sanguinosus Régimbart, 1895
 Laccophilus schereri Brancucci, 1983
 Laccophilus schwarzi Fall, 1917
 Laccophilus secundus Régimbart, 1895
 Laccophilus seminiger Fauvel, 1883
 Laccophilus seseanus Toledo, Hendrich & Stastný, 2002
 Laccophilus seyrigi Guignot, 1937
 Laccophilus sharpi Régimbart, 1889
 Laccophilus shephardi Omer-Cooper, 1965
 Laccophilus siamensis Sharp, 1882
 Laccophilus simplex Sharp, 1882
 Laccophilus simplicistriatus Gschwendtner, 1932
 Laccophilus simulator Omer-Cooper, 1958
 Laccophilus smithi Brancucci, 1983
 Laccophilus sonorensis Zimmerman, 1970
 Laccophilus sordidus Sharp, 1882
 Laccophilus spangleri Zimmerman, 1970
 Laccophilus spergatus Sharp, 1882
 Laccophilus strigatus (Schlechtendal, 1894)
 Laccophilus sublineatus Sharp, 1882
 Laccophilus subsignatus Sharp, 1882
 Laccophilus succineus Régimbart, 1889
 Laccophilus suffusus Sharp, 1882
 Laccophilus taeniolatus Régimbart, 1889
 Laccophilus tarsalis Sharp, 1882
 Laccophilus tavetensis Guignot, 1941
 Laccophilus testudo Régimbart, 1903
 Laccophilus tigrinus Guignot, 1959
 Laccophilus tiphius Guignot, 1955
 Laccophilus tobaensis Brancucci, 1983
 Laccophilus tonkinensis Brancucci, 1983
 Laccophilus torquatus Guignot, 1956
 Laccophilus traili Sharp, 1882
 Laccophilus transversalis Régimbart, 1877
 Laccophilus trilineola Régimbart, 1889
 Laccophilus tschoffeni Régimbart, 1895
 Laccophilus uncletan Hájek & Stastný, 2005
 Laccophilus undatus Aubé, 1838
 Laccophilus uniformis Motschulsky, 1859
 Laccophilus univittatus Régimbart, 1892
 Laccophilus vacaensis Young, 1953
 Laccophilus vagelineatus Zimmermann, 1922
 Laccophilus vagepictus Sharp, 1882
 Laccophilus venezuelensis Régimbart, 1889
 Laccophilus venustus Chevrolat, 1863
 Laccophilus vermiculosus Gerstaecker, 1867
 Laccophilus vietnamensis Balke & Hendrich, 1997
 Laccophilus villiersi Bertrand & Legros, 1975
 Laccophilus virgatus Guignot, 1953
 Laccophilus vitshumbii Guignot, 1959
 Laccophilus walkeri J.Balfour-Browne, 1939
 Laccophilus wittei Guignot, 1952
 Laccophilus wittmeri Brancucci, 1983
 Laccophilus wolfei Brancucci, 1983
 Laccophilus youngi Zimmerman, 1970
 Laccophilus yvietae Le Guillou, 1844

References

External links

Laccophilus at Fauna Europaea

Dytiscidae